The Institut Supérieur des Études Technologiques de Charguia (Higher Institute of Technological Studies of Charguia), commonly abbreviated ISET Charguia or ISETch, was created by virtue of Decree no. 2000-981, dated 11 May 2000. It falls under the General Direction of Technogical Studies of the Ministry of Higher Education.

It comprises two departments: information technology and business administration.

References

Universities in Tunisia